Stephen Benton Elkins (September 26, 1841January 4, 1911) was an American industrialist and politician. He served as the Secretary of War between 1891 and 1893. He served in the United States Congress as a Delegate from the Territory of New Mexico and a Senator from West Virginia.

Biography

Early life
Stephen Benton Elkins was born on September 26, 1841, near New Lexington, Ohio and moved with his family to Westport, Missouri (now part of Kansas City) in the mid-1840s. His parents were Philip Duncan Elkins and Sarah Pickett Withers. He attended the Masonic College in Lexington, Missouri in the 1850s, and graduated from the University of Missouri in Columbia in 1860.  After graduation, he briefly taught school in Cass County, Missouri.  Among his pupils was future James-Younger Gang member Cole Younger.

Civil War
In the American Civil War Elkins' father and brother joined the Confederate Army under Sterling Price, but he joined the Union Army.  Before he joined the Union Army he was to encounter Quantrill's Raiders twice and was spared from being killed because of his father and brother.  He noted:

Elkins entered the Union Army as a captain of militia in the 77th Missouri Infantry.  He served under Kersey Coates and only saw action once in the Battle of Lone Jack, which he said filled him with disgust for war.  Elkins noted that his good fortune of being protected by Quantrill matched a fear of being butchered by Quantrill for becoming a Union soldier as Quantrill's Raiders were thought to be present at the battle.

Elkins and Foster from the Lone Jack Battle were to argue for a pardon for Younger following his conviction in the Northfield, Minnesota bank robbery (Younger had rescued Foster from execution by Quantrill's Raiders in the battle).

New Mexico
Elkins entered the practice of law at Mesilla, New Mexico, and was elected to the territorial legislature in 1864 and 1865. He was appointed territorial district attorney for a term from 1866 to 1867. It was at this time, on June 10, 1866, that he married his first wife Sarah Simms Jacobs.

In 1867, Elkins served as attorney general of the territory and later as U.S. district attorney from 1867 to 1870.  He was elected territorial delegate to the U.S. Congress in 1872, and reelected in 1874, serving from March 4, 1873, to March 4, 1877. In 1875, he met and married his second wife, Hallie Davis, and continued to practice law. He founded and was president of the Santa Fe National Bank, and pursued broad business interests in land, rail, mining, and finance including president of the massive Maxwell Land Grant Company. It is widely believed that the boundaries of the land grant were expanded by Maxwell through fraud. In attempting to evict "squattors" (legitimate land grant heirs) from the Land Grant he would be accused of being part of the Santa Fe Ring.  Along with his brother in law, Thomas B. Catron, Elkins participated in what would become the largest land speculation conspiracy in U.S. history.  Using his influence on politicians such as congressmen, territorial judges, and U.S. Surveyors General, Elkins was able to patent Spanish and Mexican land grants in his name, thereby illegally including himself as a legitimate heir to the grants.  By collectively representing opposing parties in land disputes, Elkins and Catron effectively manipulated territorial government policy to illegally partition Spanish and Mexican land grants, a direct violation of the Treaty of Guadalupe Hidalgo.

West Virginia
Elkins married Hallie Davis, daughter of Senator Henry G. Davis of West Virginia, in 1875. He became a citizen of West Virginia in 1878 and began developing oil, coal, and timber industries with his father-in-law. They partnered to form the Davis Coal and Coke Company.

Stephen and Hallie built their home, Halliehurst, in Randolph County, and the town of Elkins was established nearby. New York architect Charles T. Mott designed the house. It was given by his widow along with surrounding property to Davis and Elkins College and is now part of the college's campus. It is individually listed on the National Register of Historic Places and also is a contributing property in the Davis and Elkins Historic District.

Secretary of War

Elkins served as Secretary of War in the Benjamin Harrison administration from December 17, 1891, to March 5, 1893.  Amongst his goals were that the rank of lieutenant general be revived, and also that noncommissioned officers receive higher pay to improve the quality of the service.  He also broadened the intelligence functions of the Division of Military Information.

U.S. Senator
After his service as Secretary, Elkins was elected to the U.S. Senate in 1895, serving the state of West Virginia, and was re-elected twice.  In the Senate, he held the positions of chairman of the Committee on the Geological Survey (Fifty-sixth and Fifty-ninth Congresses), and of member of the Committee on Interstate Commerce (Fifty-seventh through Sixty-first Congresses).  Elkins served as Senator until his death in Washington, D.C. in 1911, and is interred in Maplewood Cemetery of Elkins, West Virginia.

Legacy
Stephen Benton Elkins is the namesake of Elkins, West Virginia.

See also

Davis & Elkins College, in Elkins, WV; named for Senators Elkins and Davis
Halliehurst or Senator Stephen Benton Elkins House
List of United States Congress members who died in office (1900–49)

References

Further reading
 Lambert, Oscar Doane. Stephen Benton Elkins: American Foursquare (University of Pittsburgh Press, 1955. viii + 336 pp.
 Williams, John Alexander. West Virginia and the Captains of Industry (1976)
 Williams, John Alexander. "Davis and Elkins of West Virginia: businessmen in politics" (PhD dissertation, Yale University, 1967)  ProQuest Dissertations Publishing,  1967. 6708432.
 Williams, John Alexander. "Stephen B. Elkins and the Benjamin Harrison Campaign and Cabinet, 1887-1891." Indiana Magazine of History (1972): 1-23. online

 Retrieved on 2008-10-19
Biography in Secretaries of War and Secretaries of the Army published by the United States Army Center of Military History
 Stephen B. Elkins, late a senator from West Virginia, Memorial addresses delivered in the House of Representatives and Senate frontispiece 1912

External links

 
Death of Stephen B. Elkins

|-

|-

|-

1841 births
1911 deaths
American bank presidents
American city founders
American energy industry executives
Benjamin Harrison administration cabinet members
Businesspeople from West Virginia
Davis and Elkins family
Delegates to the United States House of Representatives from New Mexico Territory
District attorneys in New Mexico
Members of the New Mexico Territorial Legislature
New Mexico Attorneys General
Union Army officers
United States Secretaries of War
United States Attorneys for the District of New Mexico
People from Elkins, West Virginia
People from Perry County, Ohio
People of Missouri in the American Civil War
Republican Party United States senators from West Virginia
University of Missouri alumni
New Mexico Republicans
Republican Party members of the United States House of Representatives from West Virginia
19th-century American politicians
Davis & Elkins College